Donald Bland (23 July 1931 – 6 May 2006) was a British swimmer. He competed in the men's 1500 metre freestyle at the 1948 Summer Olympics.

Bland also represented England and won a bronze medal in the 880 yards Freestyle Relay at the 1950 British Empire Games in Auckland, New Zealand. Four years later he represented England in three freestyle events at the 1954 British Empire and Commonwealth Games.

References

1931 births
2006 deaths
British male swimmers
Olympic swimmers of Great Britain
Swimmers at the 1948 Summer Olympics
Sportspeople from Gateshead
Commonwealth Games medallists in swimming
Commonwealth Games bronze medallists for England
Swimmers at the 1950 British Empire Games
Medallists at the 1950 British Empire Games